Grover Cullen Jennings (April 21, 1939 – June 8, 2020) was an American attorney and politician who served in the Virginia House of Delegates from 1982 until 1993, when he was defeated for reelection by Barnes Lee Kidd. His father, W. Pat Jennings, was a member of the United States House of Representatives.

Jennings was born in Sugar Grove, Virginia and graduated from Marion High School in Marion, Virginia in 1958. He received his bachelor's degree from Virginia Tech in 1962 and his law degree from University of Richmond School of Law in 1965. Jennings practiced law in Marion, Virginia. He died in an automobile accident in Johnson City, Tennessee.

References

External links 
 

1939 births
2020 deaths
People from Marion, Virginia
Democratic Party members of the Virginia House of Delegates
University of Richmond School of Law alumni
Virginia lawyers
Road incident deaths in Virginia
20th-century American politicians